James William Spain (July 22, 1926 – January 2, 2008) was in the US Foreign Service with postings in Karachi, Islamabad, Istanbul, Ankara, Dar Es Salaam, and Colombo and four ambassadorships in Tanzania, Turkey, the United Nations (as deputy permanent representative), and Sri Lanka.

His son is Patrick Spain, founder of Hoover's and HighBeam Research.

Biography
Spain was born in 1926 in Chicago, Illinois, to Irish immigrants who worked as a streetcar conductor and a seamstress.  He attended St Brendan's Parochial School and Archbishop Quigley Preparatory Seminary where his classmates included priest/author Andrew Greeley and "Vatican Banker" Paul Marcinkus. He received a master's degree from the University of Chicago and a PhD from Columbia University.

Spain served in World War II, for a time serving on General Douglas MacArthur's staff as a photographer in occupied Japan. He entered the Foreign Service in 1951, and spent the entirety of his career in government service. His assignments took him to Pakistan, Turkey, Tanzania, the UN, and Sri Lanka.

His first post was as Vice Consul in Karachi in 1951.  Following that he returned the U.S. where he lived, mostly in Washington, DC, until 1969. He was appointed as Chargé d'Affaires to Pakistan in 1969, Consul General in Istanbul from 1970–1972, Deputy Chief of Mission in Ankara (1972–1974), Ambassador to Tanzania (1975–1979) and  Deputy Ambassador to the United Nations under Andrew Young briefly in 1979, Ambassador to Turkey from 1980–1981, and finally as Ambassador to Sri Lanka from 1985 - 1988. He retired a Career Minister in the Foreign Service and remained in Sri Lanka until 2006, when he returned to the United States, settling in Wilmington, NC.

He was the author of numerous books, including In Those Days, American Diplomacy in Turkey, The Way of the Pathans, Pathans of the Latter Day, and a series of novels featuring Dodo Dillon. He contributed articles on foreign affairs to a variety of publications.

Spain played pivotal roles in maintaining and strengthening the United States alliance with Turkey, in bringing about a peaceful transition to majority rule in Zimbabwe, and strengthening the United States' relations with all the countries of the subcontinent. One of his earliest memories of growing up on the South Side of Chicago was being taken by his father to watch Al Capone walk through City Hall. His glimpse of the legendary gangster impressed many, among them Jawaharlal Nehru, the first prime minister of India, who once held up a reception line just to hear about it.

Personal life
In retirement Spain actively engaged in organizing a power and irrigation project in Sri Lanka. He died on January 2, 2008, of natural causes in Wilmington, North Carolina, at the age of 81.

He was preceded in death by his wife Edith and daughter Sikandra. He is survived by his sons, Patrick Spain, Stephen, William (since deceased) and his grandchildren, Jeanne, James, Aidan, Katherine, and Rachel.

Publications
Spain authored a number of books. In Those Days: A Diplomat Remembers is his autobiography, a memoir of his time as an American diplomat who spent most of his life in Asia and Africa, engaged in high-level diplomacy.
He is also the author of The Pathan Borderland; People of the Khyber; Pathans of the Latter Day; American Diplomacy in Turkey and The way of the Pathans.

External links
Kent State University Press: Review of In Those Days: A Diplomat Remembers
 Asian Tribune Obituary The Demise of American Diplomat James W. Spain: An Eulogy
 Daily News (Sri Lanka) Obituary: Recollections of Ambassador James W. Spain
 Press release from U.S. Embassy, Colombo regarding death of former Ambassador James Spain
 Video of Senator Patrick Leahy's Tribute to James Spain on the floor of the U.S. Senate on February 4, 2008
 Memories in Asia

Ambassadors of the United States to Turkey
Cold War diplomats
Political realists
1926 births
2008 deaths
Ambassadors of the United States to Sri Lanka
United States Foreign Service personnel
People from Chicago
Columbia University alumni
University of Chicago alumni
American expatriates in Pakistan
American expatriates in Tanzania
20th-century American diplomats